The women's long jump event at the 1996 World Junior Championships in Athletics was held in Sydney, Australia, at International Athletic Centre on 22 and 23 August.

Medalists

Results

Final
23 August

Qualifications
22 Aug

Group A

Group B

Participation
According to an unofficial count, 24 athletes from 19 countries participated in the event.

References

Long jump
Long jump at the World Athletics U20 Championships